Palaquium petiolare is a species of plant in the family Sapotaceae. It is endemic to Sri Lanka.

References

petiolare
Endemic flora of Sri Lanka
Taxonomy articles created by Polbot
Plants described in 1890